Chowdaheads is an animated television series created by Noah Belson and Eli Roth.  The show was originally scheduled to air during WCW wrestling events but it never actually aired.  Roth, the co-creator of the series went on to a successful career in film directing with such films as Cabin Fever, Hostel and Hostel 2.

References

External links

1990s American animated television series
1999 American television series debuts
1999 American television series endings
English-language television shows